St Tarcisius Church may refer to:

United Kingdom
 St Tarcisius Church, Camberley, Surrey

United States
 St Tarcisius Church, Framingham, see Places of worship in Framingham, Massachusetts

See also
 Saint Tarcisius